Herbert "Hacki" Wimmer (born 9 November 1944) is a German former professional footballer who played as a midfielder. Besides winning five national championships and two UEFA Cups with his club side Borussia Mönchengladbach, he won the 1974 World Cup and the UEFA Euro 1972 with Germany.

Club career 
Wimmer started his playing career with lowly Borussia Brand (a place close to the city of Aachen). Between 1966 and 1978, he played in 366 Bundesliga matches for Borussia Mönchengladbach and scored 51 goals. With the club, he won five national championships (in 1970, 1971, 1975, 1976, and 1977), the German Cup in 1973, and the UEFA Cup in 1975.

Wimmer started out as a forward, but in Mönchengladbach, his role was primarily to cover defensively for the star of the team in this era, midfield playmaker Günter Netzer. His physical endurance, which earned him the nickname the Iron Lung, was one of his major assets. Wimmer was considered as a paragon of a player that never runs out of steam. As such, Jonathan Wilson, when writing for The Guardian in 2013, described him as a "destroyer," which is a type of holding midfielder whose role is mainly to help win back possession and distribute the ball to other players.

International career 
Between 1968 and 1976, Wimmer also played in 36 matches for the West German national team, where he scored four goals. With West Germany, he won the 1972 European Football Championship – he scored the second goal in the 3–0 win in the final against the USSR – and the 1974 FIFA World Cup, where he took part in two matches.

Honours
Borussia Mönchengladbach
 Bundesliga: 1969–70, 1970–71, 1974–75, 1975–76, 1976–77
 DFB-Pokal: 1972–73
 UEFA Cup: 1974–75; runner-up: 1972–73
 European Cup runner-up: 1976–77

West Germany
 FIFA World Cup: 1974
 UEFA European Championship: 1972; runner-up: 1976

Individual
 UEFA European Championship Team of the Tournament: 1972
 kicker Bundesliga Team of the Season: 1975–76

References

External links
 
 
 
 

1944 births
Living people
People from Eupen
German footballers
Germany international footballers
Belgian footballers
Belgian people of German descent
Borussia Mönchengladbach players
UEFA Euro 1972 players
UEFA Euro 1976 players
UEFA European Championship-winning players
1974 FIFA World Cup players
FIFA World Cup-winning players
Bundesliga players
Association football midfielders
UEFA Cup winning players
West German footballers
Sportspeople from Aachen
Footballers from North Rhine-Westphalia
Footballers from Liège Province